My Favourite Fabric is a 2018 internationally co-produced drama film directed by Gaya Jiji. It was screened in the Un Certain Regard section at the 2018 Cannes Film Festival.

Cast
 Metin Akdülger as The dream man
 Manal Issa as Nahla
 Ula Tabari as Madame Jiji
 Gaya Jiji	as Manal
 Wissam Fares as Salem
 Saad Lostan as Samir
 Amani Ibrahim as Shirin
 Rand Raslan as Samar
 Nathalie Issa as Line
 Thuraya Baghdadi as Salwa (Souraya Baghdadi)
 Mariah Tannoury as Myriam
 Hala Sayasne as Zahra

References

External links
 

2018 films
2018 drama films
French drama films
German drama films
Turkish drama films
2010s Arabic-language films
2010s French films
2010s German films